Morone is a genus of temperate basses native to the Atlantic coast of North America and the freshwater systems of the southwestern and eastern United States.

Species
The currently recognized species in this genus are:

References

 
Moronidae
 
Extant Eocene first appearances